BTX may refer to:
 Bildschirmtext, an interactive videotex system launched in 1983 in West Germany
 BTX (chemistry), a mixture of benzene, toluene and xylenes
 B't X, a science fiction manga and anime television series created by Masami Kurumada
 BTX (form factor), a form factor for PC motherboards
 Backstreets Magazine, also known as BTX, a popular Internet forum for fans of musician Bruce Springsteen
 Batrachotoxin, a neurotoxic poison that blocks sodium channels
 Botulinum toxin, the most potent neurotoxin known